The King Edward Stakes is a Canadian Thoroughbred horse race run annually at Woodbine Racetrack in Toronto, Ontario. The Grade II turf race is open to horses aged three and older and is raced over a distance of one mile (8 furlongs). Run in late June or early July, it currently offers a purse of CAD$200,000.

Named for Edward VII of the United Kingdom who had been crowned king in 1901, the race was created the following year with its first running taking place in 1903 as the King Edward Gold Cup. It was raced on dirt at the Old Woodbine Park until 1958 when it was moved to Woodbine Racetrack and changed to a turf race. Renamed the King Edward Breeders' Handicap, in 2007 it became a Stakes event.

Since inception, the King Edward Stakes has been raced at a variety of distances:

  miles : 1903-1917 (Old Woodbine Racetrack)
  miles : 1920-1957 on dirt at Old Woodbine Park,   1958-1993 on turf at Woodbine Racetrack, and on turf in 1994 at Fort Erie Race Track
  miles : 1995-2009 on turf at Woodbine Racetrack
 1 mile : beginning 2010

Due to the large number of entries, the King Edward was raced in two divisions in 1978, 1984, 1985, 1987, and 1988. There was no race held in 1918, 1919, 1943, 1945, and 1956.

Records
Speed record: (at current distance of 1 mile)
 1:32.45 - Tower of Texas (2015)
Speed  record: (at distance of  miles)
 1:44.73 - Rahy's Attorney (2009) (new stakes and course record)

Most wins:
 3 - Inferno (1906, 1907, 1908)

Most wins by an owner:
 9 - Sam-Son Farm (1974, 1987, 1988, 1991, 1997, 1999, 2001, 2005, 2010)

Most wins by a jockey:
 4 - Robin Platts (1968, 1977, 1978, 1979)
 4 - Dave Penna (1986, 1987, 1989, 1990)

Most wins by a trainer:
 7 - Lou Cavalaris, Jr. (1959, 1965, 1966, 1967, 1968, 1976, 1978)

Winners of the King Edward Stakes

See also
 List of Canadian flat horse races

References

 King Edward Stakes at Pedigree Query

Graded stakes races in Canada
Open mile category horse races
Woodbine Racetrack
Recurring sporting events established in 1903
1903 establishments in Ontario
Horse races in Ontario